Hever railway station is on the  branch of the Oxted line in southern England and serves Hever in Kent. The station is managed by Southern.

Hever Castle is about a  walk from the station.

History

The station was opened by the London, Brighton and South Coast Railway on 1 October 1888. It passed onto the Southern Railway in 1923 and to British Railways in 1948. The signal box was built into the station building and remained in use until the line was resignalled in January 1990 when the station was destaffed.

Facilities
Hever station is unstaffed and tickets must be bought from the self-service ticket machine at the station. 

The station has passenger help points and covered seating areas available on both platforms. The station has a small cycle rack located on the Uckfield bound platform.

The Uckfield bound platform is accessible without steps however the London bound platform is only reachable by the stepped footbridge so isn't accessible.

Services
All services at Hever are operated by Southern using  DMUs.

The typical off-peak service in trains per hour is:
 1 tph to  via 
 1 tph to 
 
Services increase to 2 tph in each direction during the peak hours. 

On Sundays, the northbound service runs as far as Oxted only.

References

External links 

Buildings and structures in Sevenoaks District
Railway stations in Kent
Former London, Brighton and South Coast Railway stations
Railway stations in Great Britain opened in 1888
Railway stations served by Govia Thameslink Railway